South Carolina Highway 651 (SC 651) is a  state highway in the U.S. state of South Carolina. The highway connects Cottageville with rural areas of Colleton County. It is known as Rehoboth Road for its entire length.

Route description
SC 651 begins at an intersection with U.S. Route 17 Alternate (US 17 Alt.; Cottageville Highway) in Cottageville, within Colleton County. It travels to the north-northeast and almost immediately leaves the city limits. The highway curves to the north-northwest and then heads on a fairly northerly direction before crossing over Horse Pen Branch. It curves again to the north-northwest and meets its northern terminus, an intersection with SC 61 (Augusta Highway).

Major intersections

See also

References

External links

SC 651 at Virginia Highways' South Carolina Highways Annex

651
Transportation in Colleton County, South Carolina